The Großer Winterberg ("Great Winterberg") is a mountain, and a subpeak of the Wurmberg, the highest mountain in the neighbouring state of Lower Saxony in the High Harz of central Germany. The Großer Winterberg rises within the borough of Wernigerode in the county of Harz in the state of Saxony-Anhalt.

Location 
The Großer Winterberg lies within the Harz/Saxony-Anhalt Nature Park and the Harz National Park immediately northeast of the state border with Lower Saxony and about 2.5 km west-southwest of the village of Schierke in the borough of Wernigerode. To the north-northwest the countryside descends into the valley of the Cold Bode, on the other side of which rises the legendary Brocken (1,141.1 m), in front of which are the Königsberg (1,033.5 m) to the west and the Heinrichshöhe (ca. 1,045 m) to the east. From northeast to east-northeast, above Schierke on the other side of Cold Bode rises the ridge of Hohnekamm (900.6 m; with its tors, the Hohneklippen). To the southeast is the Kleiner Winterberg ("Little Winterberg", 837.0 m). To the southwest the countryside climbs gradually over the state border up to the Wurmberg.

Winter sports resort 
As part of the Wurmberg 2015 project a ski lift or gondola lift and four new downhill runs are planned, running down from the region between the mountains of Großer and Kleiner Winterberg and the Wurmberg towards Schierke.

References 

Wernigerode
Mountains of the Harz
Mountains and hills of Saxony-Anhalt
Mountains under 1000 metres